Partus may refer to:

 childbirth, the culmination of a woman's pregnancy period with delivery of a newborn child
 Partus praematurus, medical term for premature birth of a baby 
 partus sequitur ventrum, a legal doctrine relating to the citizenship status of children born to slaves